Craig Chase Stevens (born September 1, 1984) is a former American football tight end who played eight seasons for the Tennessee Titans of the National Football League (NFL). He was drafted by the Titans in the third round of the 2008 NFL Draft. He played college football at California.

Early years
Stevens attended Palos Verdes Peninsula High School in Rolling Hills Estates, California.

Professional career
Stevens played for the Tennessee Titans of the NFL from 2008 to 2015. Throughout his career, he was mainly used as a blocking tight end and special teams player.

On February 18, 2016, Stevens re-signed with the Titans. The Titans announced Stevens's retirement on August 23, 2016. He finished his career with 60 receptions for 724 yards and six touchdowns.

Family
Craig has a younger brother, Eric, who played fullback for the St. Louis Rams. Jeff Fisher, who drafted Craig, picked up Eric as an undrafted free agent.

Craig is the cousin of American pole vaulter, Mike Tully, who won a silver in the 1984 Summer Olympics.

References

External links
Tennessee Titans bio
California Golden Bears bio

1984 births
Living people
American football tight ends
California Golden Bears football players
People from San Pedro, Los Angeles
Players of American football from Los Angeles
Tennessee Titans players
Ed Block Courage Award recipients